The Estádio Carlos de Alencar Pinto, better known as Vovozão, is a football stadium located in Fortaleza, Ceará, Brazil. It is currently used mostly for training and is the home stadium of Ceará Sporting Club.

References

Football venues in Ceará
Ceará Sporting Club
Estadio Carlos de Alencar Pinto